There are more than 9000 Grade I listed buildings in England.  This page is a list of these buildings in the county of Durham, sub-divided by unitary authority.

County Durham

|}

Darlington

|}

Hartlepool

|}

Stockton-on-Tees

|}

Notes

See also
 Grade II* listed buildings in County Durham

References 
National Heritage List for England
 Keys To The Past Durham/Northumbria councils site

External links

 
Durham
 Grade I
Lists of Grade I listed buildings in North Yorkshire